The Leo Baeck Institute Jerusalem for the Study of German and Central European Jewry, founded in 1955, is a research institute based in Jerusalem, Israel. While affiliated with the Leo Baeck Institute and its affiliates in New York/Berlin (Leo Baeck Institute New York) and London (Leo Baeck Institute London), it is an independent organization under Israeli law. Since 2019, the institute has been led by Galili Shaḥar.

History

As the second generation took over, the LBI Jerusalem transformed from a memorial community to a research centre. Almost all members of the LBI Jerusalem’s second generation were professional historians; most had left Germany as children or adolescents and had either little of no share at all in the founders memories. For this reason the “memorial function” of the historiography now lost significance. In its place came more strictly scholarly aspirations.

Through their publications, scholarly seminars, academic and cultural events, alongside an archive, the Leo Baeck Institute Jerusalem has been the leading venue for German-Jewish historiography and documentation in Israel. Its archives consist of a microfilm collection of Jewish newspapers from the 19th and 20th centuries as well as a collection of family papers, genealogical materials and community histories.

Leadership 
Chairpersons of Leo Baeck Institute, Jerusalem, have been:
 1956–1979: Hans Tramer
 1981–1992: Jacob Katz
 1993–1994: Josef Walk
 1995–1997: Avraham Barkai
 1997–2003: Robert Liberles
 2003–2007: Zvi Bacharach
 2008–2019: Shmuel Feiner
 2019-present: Galili Shaḥar

References

Bibliography

External links
  

Ashkenazi Jewish culture in Jerusalem
German-Jewish culture in Jerusalem
Jerusalem
Charities based in Israel
Jewish organizations based in Israel
1955 establishments in Israel
Organizations established in 1955